Mikhail Chekhov may refer to:
 Michael Chekhov (1891–1955), Russian-American actor, known as Mikhail until the 1930s
 Mikhail Chekhov (writer) (1865–1936), Russian writer; youngest brother of Anton Chekhov